Collotheca is a genus of rotifers belonging to the family Collothecidae.

The genus was first described by Harring in 1913.

The genus has almost cosmopolitan distribution.

Species:
 Collotheca balatonica
 Collotheca mutabilis
 Collotheca ornata

References

Collothecaceae